Moinuddin Rubel (born 12 August 1988) is a Bangladeshi cricketer. He made his first-class debut for Chittagong Division in the 2013–14 National Cricket League on 6 February 2014. He made his List A debut for Brothers Union in the 2016–17 Dhaka Premier Division Cricket League on 18 May 2017.

References

External links
 

1988 births
Living people
Bangladeshi cricketers
Brothers Union cricketers
Place of birth missing (living people)